Stephan Hennen (born 9 January 1990) is a German former footballer who played as a defender.

Career
Hennen played his first Bundesliga match for MSV Duisburg on 23 August 2012 in a 1–3 home loss against Dynamo Dresden. He left MSV Duisburg in summer 2013.

After a spell with TuS 64 Bösinghoven, he retired through injury and took up a role in marketing for SGS Essen, having previously studied sport management.

He left the club in September 2015 following the departure of manager Heiko Heinlein.

References

External links

1990 births
Living people
German footballers
Footballers from Duisburg
Association football defenders
MSV Duisburg II players
MSV Duisburg players
2. Bundesliga players
Regionalliga players